Amanda Zarine Woodcroft (born 9 October 1993) is an indoor and field hockey player from Canada.

Personal life
Amanda Woodcroft was born in Kitchener, Ontario, and grew up in the neighbouring city of Waterloo.

Woodcroft has a younger sister, Nicole, who also represents Canada in field hockey.

Career

Indoor hockey
In 2010, Woodcroft made her debut for the Canadian indoor team at the Indoor Pan American Cup in Barquisimeto.

She represented the team again in 2014 in a number of tournaments. Most notably, Woodcroft was awarded Player of the Tournament at the Indoor Pan American Cup in Montevideo where she also won a gold medal.

Field hockey

Under 21
After appearances with the senior national team, Woodcroft represented the Canada U–21 side at the 2013 FIH Junior World Cup in Mönchengladbach.

Senior national team
Woodcroft made her debut for the senior national team in 2011.

Following her debut, Woodcroft has gone on to represent the Canadian team at a number of tournaments and amassed over 100 caps.

She has medalled with the national team a number of times, winning silver at the 2018–19 FIH Series Finals in Valencia and the 2019 Pan American Games in Lima. In addition, she has won bronze at the 2013 Pan American Cup in Mendoza and the 2015 Pan American Games in Toronto.

In 2018, she was a member of the national team at the 2018 Commonwealth Games on the Gold Coast.

References

External links
 
 
 
 Amanda Zarine Woodcroft at the Lima 2019 Pan American Games

1993 births
Living people
Canadian female field hockey players
Female field hockey midfielders
Field hockey people from Ontario
Pan American Games medalists in field hockey
Sportspeople from Kitchener, Ontario
Medalists at the 2015 Pan American Games
Medalists at the 2019 Pan American Games
Field hockey players at the 2018 Commonwealth Games
Commonwealth Games competitors for Canada
Pan American Games silver medalists for Canada
Pan American Games bronze medalists for Canada
20th-century Canadian women
21st-century Canadian women